The 1995 Tooheys 1000 was the 36th running of the Bathurst 1000 touring car race. It was held on 1 October 1995, at the Mount Panorama Circuit just outside Bathurst. The race was held for cars eligible under CAMS Group 3A 5.0 Litre Touring Car regulations, that later became known as V8 Supercars. This was the first Bathurst 1000 to be contested by single class.

With only 32 cars on the starting grid it was the smallest field so far in the race's history. This was attributed to the fact that the race was run only for the outright class 5.0 Litre Touring Cars with no small car categories running for the first time in the history of the race going back to the 1960 Armstrong 500 at Phillip Island in Victoria.

Larry Perkins and Russell Ingall driving the #11 Castrol Commodore won the 1995 Tooheys 1000 in what was literally a last to first effort. Perkins clashed with the slow starting HRT Commodore of pole sitter Craig Lowndes before the first turn which pulled the valve out of a tyre forcing him to fall from third to last on the first lap before pitting to replace the tyre. The duo started to climb back up into contention, helped by cars ailing to go the race distance and Safety car periods including once after having just un-lapped themselves and were back in the top 5 with 20 laps to go.

Following the last Safety car, Perkins set about hauling in the leaders. He passed Neil Crompton's Coke Commodore and the Peter Jackson Falcon of Alan Jones to move into second place about 7 seconds behind the Falcon of Jones' team leader Glenn Seton. Then going across the top of the mountain on lap 151, Seton's engine, built by the teams chief engine builder and Glenn's dad Barry Seton dropped a valve. Going into Murray's Corner Perkins had caught up to Seton and passed him for the lead. Perkins went on to win a famous victory while Seton's race ended less than half a lap later, the Falcon coming to a stop on the climb to BP Cutting. In a show of courage, an obviously gutted Seton conducted an interview on Racecam with Channel 7 showing graciousness in defeat while the race continued with cameras in the pits showing his father Bo, head in hands not wanting to believe the race was lost after they were so close to winning.

Had Glenn Seton won the race in 1995 it would have been 30 years since his father Bo Seton had won the 1965 race driving a Ford Cortina Mk.I GT500.

Entry list

Results

Top 10 shootout

* 1995 saw the first time a father and son both qualified for the shootout. Dick Johnson, competing in his 18th straight shootout, and his son Steven Johnson, in his first, qualified their Shell FAI Racing Ford EF Falcon's in 7th and 8th place, with the younger Johnson out qualifying his more experienced dad by 0.0705 seconds.* Peter Brock crashed his Holden Racing Team VR Commodore at The Cutting during his lap, thus he did not record a time and would start 10th. His HRT teammate Craig Lowndes claimed his first Bathurst pole position with a time of 2:11.554. This was 0.766 seconds faster than his qualifying time of 2:12.32.* Following a CAMS parity adjustment which saw a reduction in size to the front spoiler of the Ford EF Falcons which had dominated the 1995 ATCC, the Ford runners claimed that they were at least a second or more per lap slower than they would have been had they been able to run the originally homologated spoiler.

Race

Statistics
 Provisional Pole Position – #11 Larry Perkins – 2:11.5764
 Pole Position – #015 Craig Lowndes – 2:11.5540
 Fastest Lap – #015 Craig Lowndes – 2:14.3239 - Lap 8
 Average Speed – 157.72 km/h
 Race Time - 6:20:32.3766

See also
1995 Australian Touring Car season

References

External links
 Official V8 Supercar website
 CAMS Manual reference to Australian titles
 race results
 1995 Tooheys 1000 images from www.autopics.com.au

Motorsport in Bathurst, New South Wales
Tooheys 1000